This page details the all-time statistics, records, and other achievements pertaining to the Minnesota Timberwolves.

Franchise Leaders 

(As of the end of the 2021–22 season)

Bold denotes still active with team.

Italic denotes still active, but not with team.

Games played

Points

Minutes Played

Rebounds

Assists

Steals

Blocks

Field goals

3–Pt Field goals

Free throws

Individual awards
NBA MVP
Kevin Garnett – 2004

NBA Rookie of the Year
Andrew Wiggins – 2015
Karl-Anthony Towns – 2016

NBA Most Improved Player
Kevin Love – 2011

J. Walter Kennedy Citizenship Award
Kevin Garnett – 2006

Twyman–Stokes Teammate of the Year Award
Jamal Crawford – 2018

All-NBA First Team
Kevin Garnett – 2000, 2003, 2004

All-NBA Second Team
Kevin Garnett – 2001, 2002, 2005
Sam Cassell – 2004
Kevin Love – 2012, 2014

All-NBA Third Team
Kevin Garnett – 1999, 2007
Karl-Anthony Towns – 2018, 2022
Jimmy Butler – 2018

NBA All-Defensive First Team
Kevin Garnett – 2000–2005

NBA All-Defensive Second Team
Kevin Garnett – 2006, 2007
Jimmy Butler – 2018

NBA All-Rookie First Team
Pooh Richardson – 1990
Christian Laettner – 1993
Isaiah Rider – 1994
Stephon Marbury – 1997
Wally Szczerbiak – 2000
Randy Foye – 2007
Ricky Rubio – 2012
Andrew Wiggins - 2015
Karl-Anthony Towns – 2016
 Anthony Edwards – 2021

NBA All-Rookie Second Team
Felton Spencer – 1991
Kevin Garnett – 1996
Craig Smith – 2007
Kevin Love – 2009
Jonny Flynn – 2010
Wesley Johnson – 2011
Derrick Williams – 2012
Gorgui Dieng – 2014
Zach LaVine - 2015

NBA All-Star Weekend
NBA All-Star Selections
Kevin Garnett - 1997, 1998, 2000, 2001, 2002, 2003, 2004, 2005, 2006, 2007
Tom Gugliotta – 1997
Wally Szczerbiak – 2002
Sam Cassell – 2004
Kevin Love – 2011, 2012, 2014
Jimmy Butler – 2018
Karl-Anthony Towns – 2018, 2019, 2022
Anthony Edwards – 2023

NBA All-Star Game head coach
Flip Saunders – 2004

NBA All-Star Game MVP
Kevin Garnett – 2003

NBA Rising Stars Challenge MVP
Wally Szczerbiak – 2001
Andrew Wiggins – 2015
Zach LaVine – 2016

NBA Slam Dunk Contest
Isaiah Rider - 1994
Zach LaVine - 2015, 2016

NBA Three-Point Shootout
Kevin Love - 2012
Karl-Anthony Towns - 2022

NBA Skills Challenge
Karl-Anthony Towns - 2016

Franchise record for championships

References

records
National Basketball Association accomplishments and records by team